Robert Bradley "Brad" James (June 15, 1962 – November 1, 2012) was an American professional wrestler, better known by his ring name, Brad Armstrong. He is best known for his appearances with the promotion World Championship Wrestling in the 1990s. He was the son of wrestler "Bullet Bob" Armstrong and brother to professional wrestlers Steve, Scott and Brian.

Professional wrestling career

National Wrestling Alliance and World Championship Wrestling (1980–1995)

Brad Armstrong started out in the National Wrestling Alliance's Gulf Coast territory, Southeastern Championship Wrestling in July 1980 at the age of 18. He was a face, or good guy, due to his good looks and superb wrestling ability. He feuded with Jerry Stubbs and Tom Prichard during his stay there and won the NWA United States Junior Heavyweight Championship there.

Armstrong moved to the NWA's Georgia territory, Georgia Championship Wrestling, in 1984, where he feuded with Tom McCartney, Ted DiBiase alongside his father Bob and then "White Lightning" Tim Horner, with whom he formed The Lightning Express. Armstrong's in ring ability allowed him to take great advantage of a mix of technical wrestling and explosive speed in his style. It was during this time that Armstrong was involved in an angle with Tommy Rich. Rich was in a feud with Ted DiBiase. They had a "loser leaves wrestling" match that Rich lost. So, Rich put on a mask & came back as Mr. R. DiBiase insisted that Mr R. was really Rich. Then, on a TV match for Dibiase's NWA National Title, Rich visited announcer Gordon Solie during the match. Dibiase unmasked Mr R. to find that it was actually Armstrong. In all of the confusion, Armstrong pinned Dibiase to become NWA National Champion for his first of two times holding that belt.

Armstrong held the NWA National Tag Team Championship twice that year, once with his father, and once with Horner. All three returned to Southeastern Championship Wrestling in 1985, before eventually joining the NWA's Mid-Atlantic territory, Jim Crockett Promotions, in late 1986. Armstrong feuded with Jimmy Garvin, locked horns with the Four Horsemen, and teamed with both his father and Horner at various times.

In 1986, Brad went on his first tour of Japan for All Japan Pro Wrestling, to take part in a tournament to determine the first World Junior Heavyweight Championship. Brad made it to finals, but lost the match and the title to Hiro Saito on July 31.

Armstrong then moved to Cowboy Bill Watts' Mid-South Wrestling / Universal Wrestling Federation, in 1986 where he won The North American Heavyweight Championship from Ernie Ladd in 1986 and losing it to Ted DiBiase a month later. In early 1987, Brad reunited with Tim Horner forming a tag team known as "The Lightning Express, winning the UWF Tag Team Championship from future superstars Sting and Rick Steiner. They then feuded with the "Sheepherders," later known as The Bushwhackers, Butch Miller and Luke Williams, to whom they eventually lost their belts.

The Lightning Express then went back to Jim Crockett Promotions (which became World Championship Wrestling in November 1988) after the UWF was bought out by Crockett, but were not pushed, and Horner left for the WWF in late 1988. Armstrong bounced between singles wrestling, temporary tag teams, and sorting out personal issues for much of the next few years.

After teaming with a returning Tim Horner during the summer of 1990, Armstrong announced on the August 4, 1990 edition of WCW Saturday Night that he would be forming a new tandem with Doug Furnas, and that they planned on challenging for the United States Tag-Team Championship. However Furnas would leave the company shortly thereafter, leaving Armstrong to continue his Lightning Express partnership with Tim Horner and to also occasionally team with David Sierra and Brad Anderson. In September 1990 he was split off as a singles wrestler again and rebranded The Candyman. Dressed in red and white tights and handing out candy to fans on his way to the ring, Armstrong began to receive his first significant singles push in the new WCW. He went undefeated, pinning Dutch Mantell, Buddy Landell, and James Earl Wright over the next two weeks. At the 1990 Halloween Havoc, Armstrong faced JW Storm (Jeff Warner), who was a recent addition to WCW and was also on an undefeated streak. The Candyman pinned Storm in what Jim Ross stated was an upset. The run finally ended on November 15, when The Iron Sheik upset The Candyman on a house show in Kansas City, Kansas.

On Clash of Champions XXIII on November 20, The Candyman was defeated by the debuting Big Cat after the referee stopped the match. By the beginning of 1991, Armstrong had dropped the Candyman gimmick and had reunited with Tim Horner. In January 1991, the Lightning Express faced The Fabulous Freebirds at a World Championship Wrestling TV taping, going to a double disqualification. They would also face Arn Anderson and Barry Windham and The Royal Family during this period. On February 24 at WrestleWar 91, Armstrong was defeated by Bobby Eaton.

In April 1991, The Fabulous Freebirds began speaking of a third member named Fantasia, who debuted at SuperBrawl I on May 19 to help the Freebirds capture the vacant WCW United States Tag Team Titles from the Young Pistols. Armstrong, under a mask and covered in black feathers, would quickly have his name changed to Badstreet (the name was changed to prevent legal action from Disney). The three Freebirds then won the WCW World Six-Man Tag Team Championship, while Hayes and Garvin held the WCW United States Tag Team Championship. Armstrong never revealed his Badstreet identity on television. As a result, he was able to interfere on behalf of both sides during the Freebirds' win over the Young Pistols for the vacant U.S. Tag Team Championship at SuperBrawl I, firstly as himself on behalf of the Pistols (who included his brother Steve) then later as Fantasia on behalf of the Freebirds, all within the space of the same title match. In September 1991, Armstrong began to tour Japan with New Japan Pro-Wrestling, where he would tour Japan with ten times between 1991 and 1996.

Later that year, Armstrong was given another masked gimmick, Arachnaman, who bore such a strong resemblance to Spider-Man that Marvel Comics threatened legal action, causing WCW to quickly drop the character.

On July 5, 1992, Armstrong won the WCW Light Heavyweight Championship (also known as the second incarnation of the NWA World Junior Heavyweight Championship and the first incarnation of the WCW Cruiserweight Championship), by defeating Scotty Flamingo. He soon injured his knee during a tour of Japan in a match against The Great Muta in Sapporo, and was stripped of the title at the Clash of the Champions XX two months later. He returned weeks later, and remained with the company until early 1995.

Armstrong returned in early 1995 teaming with Tim Horner wrestling on WCW Saturday Night and Worldwide.

Smoky Mountain Wrestling and United States Wrestling Association (1995–1996)
In June 1995, Armstrong joined Smoky Mountain Wrestling. By August, he'd split his time between SMW in Knoxville and United States Wrestling Association in Memphis. Armstrong won both The USWA Heavyweight Championship (defeating Billy Jack Haynes on August 4, but lost it back to Haynes on August 7) and the SMW Heavyweight Championship three times (defeating Buddy Landel on August 12, losing it to Terry Gordy on October 20, regained it from Gordy on November 23, losing it to Tommy Rich on November 25, regained it on November 27, and lost it to Jerry Lawler on December 26) during his stay. After SMW folded in December 1995, Armstrong wrestled regularly for the USWA until February 1996 when he returned to WCW. In December 1995, he toured Europe for Otto Wanz's Catch Wrestling Association, losing a CWA World Middleweight Championship match to champion Fit Finlay in the tenth round.

World Championship Wrestling (1996–2001)

Armstrong eventually returned to WCW in February 1996. At Slamboree, Armstrong unsuccessfully challenged Dean Malenko for the WCW World Cruiserweight Championship, despite a highly technical match, before leaving in November 1996 to tour with New Japan Pro-Wrestling.

Upon his return to WCW in the summer of 1997, Brad had developed a heel turn, changing his look, sporting short hair and a goatee, and had developed a bad attitude and mean streak. By the end of the year, he developed a string of losses, which he blamed on the "Armstrong Curse".

He lost to Goldberg at SuperBrawl VIII during Goldberg's undefeated streak.

In 1999, he was repackaged as "B.A.", a member of The No Limit Soldiers stable. After the group disbanded, he began a feud with Berlyn, who attacked Armstrong's brother Scott and badmouthed the United States of America. The feud ran through Halloween Havoc, where Armstrong defeated Berlyn.

After Halloween Havoc, Vince Russo forced Armstrong to find a gimmick. He was later given the gimmick of "Buzzkill", as a hippie with a Tie-dye shirt and a takeoff of his brother Brian's gimmick, Road Dogg. As "Buzzkill," Armstrong used an entrance theme similar to the one used by the New Age Outlaws in the WWF. The gimmick was less successful due to fans feeling it an imitation of the Road Dogg persona, as well as a lack of awareness that the two were brothers.

He injured his knee in March 2000 in an accident backstage at a WCW Saturday Night taping, where Armstrong got run over by Juventud Guerrera and Psicosis, severely injuring his knee. After going through knee surgery, his WCW contract expired as the company was bought by WWF in 2001, and he retired from wrestling.

Independent circuit (2004–2011)
Armstrong came out of retirement in 2004. His first match back was teaming with Greg Brown losing to Sonny Siaki and Masked Superstar on May 18 of that year in Columbus, Georgia. Wrestled in the independent circuit only in the Southeast in Georgia, Alabama and Tennessee. Armstrong started teaming with his dad and his brother Scott winning a couple of tag titles.

On February 19, 2005 he defeated George South for the EWA Heavyweight Title. In 2005 and 2006 the Armstrongs feuded with the Midnight Express. Between 2007 and 2010 he feuded with Midnight Express member Dennis Condrey.

In 2010, he began teaming with Ricky Morton winning the NWA Mid-Atlantic Tag Team titles defeating Chris Hamrick and Jeff Lewis.

His last wrestling match was on February 12, 2011 where he lost to Kyle Matthews in Villa Rica, Georgia.

World Wrestling Entertainment / WWE (2006–2012)
On September 12, 2006, Armstrong signed a contract with World Wrestling Entertainment and began wrestling at ECW brand house shows against Eric Pérez and acting as a trainer to the younger members of the roster. In December, around the time rumors of ECW color commentator Tazz leaving the company began to circulate, Armstrong began to make sporadic appearances as a "guest commentator" on the brand. The three-man booth, originally for a single match on the December 19 episode before expanding to a full show on January 9, did not last and Armstrong resumed his role as a producer. While working as a producer for WWE, Armstrong continued to wrestle for various independent promotions in the Southeast. At the same time, Armstrong worked at a health store in Marietta and volunteered at Shiloh Hills Christian School in Kennesaw, performing various functions including serving as field trip monitor and assisting with car duty on campus.

Death
On November 1, 2012, Armstrong was found dead in his Kennesaw, Georgia home, after seeing his physician the previous week for an undisclosed medical issue. His former Lightning Express tag team partner and best friend Tim Horner speculated that Armstrong died from a heart attack.

Armstrong was survived by his parents, brothers, his wife Lori Spranz (whom he married on October 17, 1998) and his daughter Jillian (born 2001).

Eulogizing Armstrong, Jim Ross described him as "one of the more talented in-ring performers I've ever worked with...one of the most underrated all-time greats ever in the business."

Championships and accomplishments
Championship Wrestling from Florida
NWA Florida Global Tag Team Championship (1 time) – with Terry Allen
Exodus Wrestling
Exodus Wrestling Heavyweight Championship (1 time)
Georgia Championship Wrestling
NWA National Heavyweight Championship (2 times)
NWA National Tag Team Championship (2 times) – with Bob Armstrong (1) and Tim Horner (1)
Mid-South Wrestling / Universal Wrestling Federation
Mid-South North American Championship (1 time)
UWF World Tag Team Championship (1 time) – with Tim Horner
NWA Rocky Top
NWA Rocky Top Tag Team Championship (1 time) – with Ricky Morton
Mid-Atlantic Championship Wrestling
MACW Tag Team Championship (1 time) – with Ricky Morton
Pro Wrestling Illustrated
Rookie of the Year (1982)
 Ranked No. 63 of the top 500 singles wrestlers in the PWI 500 in 1992
Ranked No. 270 out of the 500 best singles wrestlers of the PWI Years in 2003
Southeastern Championship Wrestling
NWA Southeastern Continental Heavyweight Championship (3 times)
NWA Southeastern Tag Team Championship (5 times) – with Bob Armstrong (3), Scott Armstrong (1), and The Shadow (Norvell Austin) (1)
NWA Southeastern United States Junior Heavyweight Championship (3 time)
Smoky Mountain Wrestling
SMW Heavyweight Championship (2 times)
Tennessee Mountain Wrestling
TMW Tag Team Championship (1 time) – with Scott Armstrong
United States Wrestling Association
USWA Heavyweight Championship (1 time)
World Championship Wrestling
WCW Light Heavyweight Championship (1 time)
WCW World Six-Man Tag Team Championship (1 time) – with Michael Hayes and Jimmy Garvin
Wrestling Observer Newsletter
Most Underrated Wrestler (1987)
Rookie of the Year (1981) shared with Brad Rheingans

Notes

External links

 

1962 births
2012 deaths
20th-century professional wrestlers
21st-century professional wrestlers
American male professional wrestlers
Masked wrestlers
Sportspeople from Marietta, Georgia
Professional wrestlers from Georgia (U.S. state)
NWA National Heavyweight Champions
NWA Florida Global Tag Team Champions
SMW Heavyweight Champions
NWA National Tag Team Champions